KSTV-LD (channel 32) is a low-power television station in Sacramento, California, United States, affiliated with LATV. The station is owned by Lazer Broadcasting, the company's only television station.

History

On July 1, 2007, KSTV dropped its simulcast of KSAO-LP (affiliated with Jewelry Television at the time) and became an affiliate of the Spanish-language network Azteca América. KSTV replaces former Azteca América affiliate KTNC-TV, which switched to the TuVision network on that date. In addition, a sale of KSTV to Bustos Media by its original owner, Cocola Broadcasting, was completed on September 13, 2007. In September 2010, Bustos transferred most of its licenses to Adelante Media Group as part of a settlement with its lenders.

On October 21, 2014, Adelante announced that it would be selling KSTV and its sister radio stations in Sacramento and Modesto to Lazer Broadcasting. The sale was completed on December 31, 2014, and became the first television station to be owned by Lazer.

On November 30, 2016, former MundoMax affiliate KSAO-LD (channel 49) became the primary affiliate of Azteca América for the Sacramento area after MundoMax ceased operations. KSTV then broadcast a frozen image of a TV program that aired on Azteca for a few months before finally signing off the air in early 2017.

In December 2017, KSTV signed on the air again as a Jewelry Television affiliate for the second time. In 2019, KSTV shut down its analog signal and converted to a digital signal, remaining on its analog-era channel number 32. At the same time, KSTV affiliated with the bilingual Spanish/English-language network LATV on a new subchannel 32.2. In July of that year, Jewelry Television and LATV swapped channel positions, making LATV the primary affiliate on KSTV's main channel.

An unrelated full-power station downstate in Ventura, California, on channel 57 signed on the air on October 1, 1990, with the KSTV call letters, as an affiliate of Galavisión. That station is now known as KJLA and is the Visión Latina affiliate for the Los Angeles television market.

Technical information

Subchannels
The station's digital signal is multiplexed:

References

External links

STV-LD
Television channels and stations established in 1999
1999 establishments in California
LATV affiliates